Astelia fragrans, commonly known as bush lily, bush flax or kakaha, is the most common astelia species found in New Zealand. It grows from sea level to elevations of approximately 900 metres. 

A. fragrans has long, sword-like green leaves, with midribs that can be red. In the centre of the plant, clumps of green flowers are produced between October and November. During summer yellow-orange fruit is created.

It was first described by William Colenso in 1883.

References

Asteliaceae
Flora of New Zealand
Taxa named by William Colenso
Plants described in 1883